Bactrocera cucurbitae, the melon fly, is a fruit fly of the family Tephritidae. It is a serious agricultural pest, particularly in Hawaii.

Identification

Adult fly
The adult melon fly is 6 to 8 mm in length. Distinctive characteristics include its wing pattern, its long third antennal segment, the reddish yellow dorsum of the thorax with light yellow markings, and the yellowish head with black spots.

Egg
The egg is elliptical, about 2 mm long, and pure white. It is almost flat on the ventral surface, and more convex on the dorsal. Eggs are often somewhat longitudinally curved.

Larva
The larva is a cylindrical-maggot shape, elongated, with the anterior end narrowed a somewhat curved ventrally. It has anterior mouth hooks, ventral fusiform areas and a flattened caudal end. Last instar larvae range from 7.5 to 11.8 mm in length. The venter has fusiform areas on segments 2 through 11. The anterior buccal carinae are usually 18 to 20 in number. The anterior spiracles are slightly convex in lateral view, with relatively small tubules averaging 18 to 20 in number.

Pupa
The puparium ranges in color from dull red or brownish yellow to dull white, and is about 5 to 6 mm in length.

Life history
Development period from egg to adult ranges from 12 to 28 days. The female may lay as many as 1,000 eggs. Eggs are generally laid in young fruit 2-4mm deep, but are also laid in the succulent stems of host plants. The eggs are deposited in cavities created by the female using its sharp ovipositor.

Pupation usually occurs in the soil. There may be as many as 8 to 10 generations a year.

Behaviour
Melon flies are most often found on low, leafy, succulent vegetation near cultivated areas. In hot weather they rest on the undersides of leaves and in shady areas. They are strong fliers and usually fly in the mornings and afternoons. They feed on the juices of decaying fruit, nectar, bird feces, and plant sap.

Mature melon fly males are attracted to several attractants e.g. anisyl acetone, cue-lure, raspberry ketone and zingerone. They are pollinators/visitors of some orchids, especially Bulbophyllum (Orchidaceae) species, that release floral fragrance containing either raspberry ketone or zingerone as floral attractant and reward.

Furthermore, male sex pheromonal components strongly deter predation by lizards.

Distribution

The melon fly is native to India, and is distributed throughout most parts of the country. It can be found throughout most of southern Asia, several countries in Africa, some island groups in the Pacific.

In the United States, it was the first tephritid fruit fly species established in Hawaii. It was introduced there from Japan around 1895, and by 1897, when it was first observed, it had already become a serious pest.

Not yet established in the continental United States, it is often intercepted at ports. Occasionally, an infestation is established, but is then eradicated.

Host plants

Melon flies use at least 125 host plants. They are major pests of beans, bittermelon, winter melon, cucumbers, eggplant, green beans, hyotan, luffa, melons, peppers, pumpkins, squashes, togan, tomatoes, watermelon, and zucchini.

Damage
In the Indomalayan realm, the melon fly is considered the most destructive pest of melons and other related crops. In Hawaii, it has caused serious damaged to melon, cucumber and tomato crops.

The melon fly can attack flowers, stem, root tissue, and fruit.

Management

Non-chemical control

Mechanical
There are two common mechanical methods of control. One is to use a protective covering to wrap the fruit while it develops. The other is to use baited traps. The latter is less cost effective and also best way to control them without affecting environment.

Cultural
The most effective cultural management technique to destroy the infested fruit that is not marketable, and then to dispose of the crop residues as soon as harvest is complete.

Biological control

Between 1947 and 1952 in Hawaii, natural enemies of fruit flies were introduced. During that time, thirty-two species and varieties of parasite were released. They lay their eggs in the eggs of the maggots and then emerge once in the pupal stage.

When the braconid parasitoids Fopius arisanus or Pysttalia fletcheri were used, and attacked both melon fly eggs and larvae at the same time, suppression of development was as much as 56%.

Chemical control
Toxicants in baits applied both to refugia of the fruit flies and sprays applied to crops have been used.

Proteinaceous liquid attractants in insecticide sprays is an effective method of controlling melon fly populations. This bait insecticide is sprayed on broad leaf plants that serve as refugia for melon flies. These baits encourage the adults to feed on the spray residue.

References

Further reading
 Agarwal, M. L., D. D. Sharma and O. Rahman. 1987. Melon Fruit-Fly and Its Control. Indian Horticulture. 32(3): 10-11.
 Bess, H. A., R. van den Bosch and F. H. Haramoto. 1961. Fruit Fly Parasites and Their Activities in Hawaii. Proc. Hawaiian Entomol. Soc. 27(3): 367-378.
 Heppner, J. B. 1989. Larvae of Fruit Flies. V. Dacus cucurbitae (Melon Fly) (Diptera: Tephritidae). Fla. Dept. Agric. & Consumer Services, Division of Plant Industry. Entomology Circular No. 315. 2 pages.
 Hill, D. S. 1983. Dacus cucurbitae Coq. pp. 391. In Agricultural Insect Pests of the Tropics and Their Control, 2nd Edition. Cambridge University Press. 746 pages.
 Lall, B. S. 1975. Studies on the Biology and Control of Fruit Fly, Dacus cucurbitae COQ. Pesticides. 9(10): 31-36.
 Liquido, N. J., R. T. Cunningham, and H. M. Couey. 1989. Infestation Rate of Papaya by Fruit Flies (Diptera: Tephritidae) in Relation to the Degree of Fruit Ripeness. J. Econ. Ent. 82(10): 213-219.
 Lockwood, S. 1957. Melon Fly, Dacus cucurbitae. Loose-Leaf Manual of Insect Control. California Department of Agriculture.
 Marsden, D. A. 1979. Insect Pest Series, No. 9. Melon Fly, Oriental Fruit Fly, Mediterranean Fruit Fly. University of Hawaii, Cooperative Extension Service, College of Tropical Agriculture & Human Resources.
 Nishida, T and H. A. Bess. 1957. Studies on the Ecology and Control of the Melon Fly Dacus (Strumeta) cucurbitae Coquillett (Diptera: Tephritidae). Hawaii Agric. Exp. Station Tech. Bull. No. 34. pages 2–44.
 Nishida, T. and F. Haramoto. 1953. Immunity of Dacus cucurbitae to Attack by Certain Parasites of Dacus dorsalis. J. Econ. Ent. 46(1): 61-64.
 Vargas, R. I. and J. R. Carey. 1990. Comparative Survival and Demographic Statistics for Wild Oriental fruit Fly, Mediterranean Fruit Fly, and Melon Fly (Diptera: Tephritidae) on Papaya. J. Econ. Ent. 83(4): 1344-1349.
 Anonymous. 1959. Insects not known to occur in the United States. Cooperative Economic Insect Report 9 (19): 343-368. Melon fly (Dacus cucurbitae (Coq.)),: 367-368.
 Back EA, Pemberton CE. 1917. The melon fly in Hawaii. U.S. Department of Agriculture Bulletin 491: 1-64.
 Bautista R, Harris E, Vargas R, Jang E. (2004). Parasitization of melon fly (Diptera: Tephritidae) by Fopius arisanus and Psyttalia fletcheri (Hymenoptera: Braconidae) and the effect of fruit substrates on host preference by parasitoids. ARS-Research. http://www.ars.usda.gov/research/publications/Publications.htm?seq_no_115=155470 (26 July 2004).
 Berg GH. 1979. Pictorial key to fruit fly larvae of the family Tephritidae. San Salvador: Organ. Internac. Reg. Sanidad. Agropec. 36 p.
 Chu HF. 1949. A classification of some larvae and puparia of the Tephritidae (Diptera). Cont. Inst. Zool., Natl. Acad. Peiping (Beijing) 5: 93-138
 Green CT. 1929. Characters of the larvae and pupae of certain fruit flies. Journal of Agricultural Research (Washington) 38: 489-504.
 Hardy DE. 1949. Studies in Hawaiian fruit flies (Diptera, Tephritidae). Proceedings of the Entomological Society of Washington 51: 181-205.
 Heppner JB. 1988. Larvae of fruit flies IV. Dacus dorsalis (Oriental fruit fly) (Diptera: Tephritidae). Florida Department of Agriculture and Consumer Services, Division of Plant Industry Entomology Circular 303: 1-2.
 Foote RK, Blanc FL. 1963. The fruit flies or Tephritidae of California. Bulletin of the California Insect Survey 7: 1-117.
 Phillips VT. 1946. The biology and identification of trypetid larvae (Diptera: Trypetidae). Memoirs of the American Entomological Society 12: 1-161.
 Pruitt JH. 1953. Identification of fruit fly larvae frequently intercepted at ports of entry of the United States. University of Florida (Gainesville), MS thesis. 69 p.
 USDA, Survey and Detection Operations, Plant Pest Control Division, Agriculture Research Service. Anonymous. 1963. The melon fly. Pamphlet 581. 4 p.
 White IM, Elson-Harris MM. 1994. Fruit Flies of Economic Significance: Their Identification and Bionomics. CAB International. Oxon, UK. 601 p.

External links
 
 University of Hawaii at Manoa study
 University of California phenology model
 Melon fly images
 Irradiation study

Bactrocera
Insect vectors of plant pathogens
Diptera of Asia
Insects described in 1849